Omer Shahzad  is a Pakistani model, actor and singer who started his career in 2011, and has since established himself as one of the country's top models and actors. He has been nominated for several awards with three consecutive Best Model Male nominations at Hum Awards.  and four consecutive nomination in Lux Style awards. He marked his screen debut in 2013 with Geo TV's drama series Adhoori Aurat in a negative role and went to work in Choti Choti Khushiyan, Chor Darwazay and hit-drama series Noor Jahan. He also marked his film debut in 2016 film Teri Meri Love Story.

Career

Modeling
Omer started his career in 2011 with modeling, when Vaneeza Ahmed had auditioned him for Bridal Couture Week,  he was one of the few ones who were selected among 200-auditionees, he recalled, "There were 200 boys and girls at the audition and I was one of the eight male models selected. Then I made an appearance in Noor's morning show on Hum TV." He achieved mainstream success when worked with a fashion coordinator for a shoot, Omer said, "It is only after you get published in a fashion publication as a model that they finally recognise you as an entity,". He then worked with Deepak Perwani, Sania Maskatiya, HSY, Zainab Chottani, Fahad Hussayn, and Zaheer Abbas, that earned him widespread acclaim and recognition.

Acting
He marked his television debut in 2013, with drama series Adhoori Aurat, he stated, "I always wanted to be an actor after watching Faisal Qureshi and Noman Ijaz in TV plays. But you have to start somewhere and modelling happened first for me," he played negative role in that drama series. Omer starred in three further drama series  Choti Choti Khushiyan, Chor Darwazay and Noor Jahan (2015) before entering into film industry.

He debuted in film industry in 2015 and is to star in upcoming 2016 romantic-comedy film Teri Meri Love Story directed by Jawad Bashir. He plays the role of Ramis, opposite Ushna Shah, Mohib Mirza and Mohsin Abbas Haider. When the movie released he it proved that his screen presence is phenomenal and he proved to be the saving grace of the movie.

In 2017 he starred in the hit drama Alif Allah Aur Insaan as one of the leads where he plays the character of Shaheer.

Omer Shahzad next starred in one of the most highly anticipated Pakistani movies of 2018 Jawani Phir Nahi Ani 2, where he was seen playing the role of the main antagonist.

Music
Saying that he would have been a singer if not a model, in 2018 he said that he'd launch his professional music career soon.

In 2022, for the second season of th television music show Kashmir Beats, he co-sung Yar Nu Meray with Ayesha Omar. The same year he released his first solo single, Akhiyaan, for Crystal Records.

Filmography

Television

Films

Discography
 Akhiyaan (2022)

Awards and nominations

References

External links
 
 
 

Living people
Pakistani male models
Pakistani male television actors
21st-century Pakistani male actors
Pakistani male singers
Male actors from Karachi
1987 births